Minister for Mines and Petroleum is a position in the government of Western Australia, currently held by Bill Johnston of the Labor Party. The position was first created in 1894, for the government of Sir John Forrest, and has existed in almost every government since then. The minister is responsible for the state government's Department of Mines and Petroleum, which oversees Western Australia's resources sector.

Titles
 19 December 1894 – 23 December 1983: Minister for Mines
 23 December 1983 – 25 February 1988: Minister for Minerals and Energy
 25 February 1988 – 16 February 2001: Minister for Mines
 3 February 2006 – 23 September 2008: Minister for Resources
 23 September 2008 – present: Minister for Mines and Petroleum

List of ministers

See also
 Minister for Energy (Western Australia)
 Minister for Regional Development (Western Australia)
 Minister for State Development (Western Australia)

References
 David Black (2014), The Western Australian Parliamentary Handbook (Twenty-Third Edition). Perth [W.A.]: Parliament of Western Australia.

Mines
Minister for Mines
Mining in Western Australia